"Ley Seca" is a song by Puerto Rican rappers Jhayco and Anuel AA. It was released on September 2, 2021 through Universal Music Latino. The song was released as the sixth single from Jhayco's second studio album Timelezz. The song peaked at number 23 on the Billboard Bubbling Under Hot 100 chart and at number 12 on the Hot Latin Songs chart.

Background 
Anuel AA announced through his Instagram account a new collaboration with Jhayco in a video in which Anuel AA can be seen showing off the design of his Bugatti Veyron along with the background song. Finally the song came out on September 2 and not on September 3 as planned, Jhayco announced that the song was the sixth single from his next studio album which was coming out in a few days.

Composition and lyric 
The song was produced by renowned Puerto Rican producer Tainy and co-written by Juno Watt and Puerto Rican singer Gale. The song is a reggaeton rhythm, the lyrics refer to the parties in the clubs, implying that the clubs are already opening this because most of them around the world were closed due to the COVID-19 pandemic.

Music video 
The music video was released the same day the single was released and was directed by Santiago Laffe, the music video reached one million views on YouTube in just one hour.

Charts

Weekly charts

Year-end charts

Certifications

See also 
 List of Billboard Hot Latin Songs and Latin Airplay number ones of 2022

References 

2021 songs
2021 singles
Jhayco songs
Anuel AA songs
Songs written by Anuel AA
Reggaeton songs
Spanish-language songs
Universal Music Latino singles